Vamanrao H. Deshpande (1907–1990; also known as Vaman Hari Deshpande) was an Indian music critic, musicologist and a prolific writer on the subject of Hindustani classical music.

Career
While he was a practising chartered accountant of fifty years' standing and was senior partner in the Batliboi Purohit chartered accountancy firm in Mumbai, India, he claimed music as his first love. Having been initiated into music in his early childhood by his father, he later received training from stalwarts in three major traditions: in the Gwalior tradition by Yadavrao Joshi and Shankarrao Kulkarni, in the Kirana tradition by Sureshbabu Mane, and in the Jaipur tradition by Naththan Khan and Mogubai Kurdikar. He shunned the concert stage, but performed regularly on the All India Radio, Mumbai, from 1932 to 1985.

For some years he was a member of the central audition board of the All India Radio and of the panel of judges of the All India Radio's music competitions. He was also a member of the arts committee of the Maharashtra state Board of Literature and Culture and of the University of Mumbai for seventeen years. In addition, he was connected with many musical institutions in various capacities.

Writings
He is the author of 'Maharashtra's Contribution to Music' (Maharashtra Information Center, New Delhi, 1972). His Marathi book Gharandaj Gayaki (1962) won the Maharashtra State Award for the best work in aesthetic criticism in 1962. The Sangeet Natak Academy, New Delhi, honoured it with an award as the best Marathi book on music during the period 1961–1969. Gharandaj Gayaki has since been translated into a number of languages, including Indian Musical Traditions in English and Gharanedar Gayaki in Hindi. It is recommended reading in the music syllabi of many educational institutions across the country.

His next book, Alapini (1979) also received the Maharashtra State Award. It has been translated into a number of languages, including in English, under the title Between Two Tanpuras. He has also written several articles on musical subjects in Marathi and English and presented many acclaimed papers at seminars and conferences.

Colleagues
He and his friend Professor Deodhar are known to have started a new trend in music criticism.

Vamanrao Deshpande was for many years closely associated with stalwart musicians, including Pt. Kumar Gandharva, Pt. Bhimsen Joshi, Smt. Kishori Amonkar among many others. He also acted as mentor and guide to many upcoming musicians of the time.

His son Satyasheel Deshpande is also a famous singer and musicologist.

Selected bibliography
 Gharandaj Gayaki (1962)
 Translated into English by S. Deshpande, as Indian musical traditions; an aesthetic study of the gharanas in Hindustani music (1973)
 Maharashtra's contribution to music (1972)
 Translated into Marathi as, Mahārāshṭrāce saṅgītātīla kārya (2010)
 Alapini (1979)
 Translated into English by Ram Deshmukh, B.R. Dhekney as Between two tanpuras (1989)

References

Further reading

External links
 https://web.archive.org/web/20080331003737/http://music.calarts.edu/~bansuri/pages/deodhar.html
 http://www.sawf.org/newedit/edit06242002/gunidas.htm
 http://www.satyasheel.com

Hindustani singers
Indian accountants
1990 deaths
1907 births
All India Radio people
20th-century Indian singers
Singers from Mumbai